Hasan Rıza (1858, Istanbul – 16 March 1913, Edirne) was a Turkish military painter. He was killed during the Balkan Wars, and is considered to be a "Şehit" (martyr).

Biography 
His father was Miralay (Colonel) Şakir Bey. He began painting at an early age, and studied at the Kuleli Military High School. In 1876, as did many of his classmates, he volunteered to serve in the Russo-Turkish War, and was wounded in the forehead. While recuperating, he noticed a newspaper story about an Italian painter who was working the front lines as a war artist. He applied to be the painter's bodyguard, and the request was granted. When he showed him some of his work, a friendship developed.  

After the war, he entered the Turkish Military Academy, but switched to the Naval Academy in 1881. While there, he was chosen to decorate the cabins and salons of the Sultaniye, a ship belonging to Sultan Abdul Hamid II, that had seen service during the war and was undergoing repairs. As a reward for his work, he was promoted to "Officer", although he later wrote that he would have preferred to be paid for it. His fellow students ridiculed him, as everyone became an officer upon graduating, anyway. This and other complaints, including the poor treatment given to his favorite teacher, led him to leave the Academy.  

Thinking about his wartime friend, he went to Italy. He spent twelve years there; visiting museums and workshops in Rome, Florence and Naples. He then spent some time studying historical artifacts in Egypt. Upon returning, he received an offer to be reinstated in his former rank, but he refused, choosing instead to open his own workshop in Edirne. There, he created portraits and historical scenes, mostly from major wars fought by the early Ottoman Empire. In each of those scenes, he would include a small portrait of himself, as a Janissary or official of some sort.

He later became principal of the local technical school, which was used as a hospital, also under his direction, during the Balkan Wars. In March, 1913, he was killed by Bulgarian soldiers as he was heading to his studio to save his paintings. He was immediately buried with over sixty Ottoman soldiers who had been killed nearby at the same time.

Laga wrapped one around himself, until he had the opportunity to hide it. Despite their efforts, his studio was looted and paintings were smashed. It is believed that about ninety-percent of his works were destroyed or lost. 

During the 1900s, Sultan Abdul Hamid had commissioned the Italian artist, Fausto Zonaro, to create a series of works depicting the life of Mehmed the Conqueror. A memoir by the artist, Hüsnü Tengüz (1874–1950), first published in 2011, led to the discovery that Zonaro had copied the basic design for some of those paintings from works by Rıza.

References

External links

 Biography and works @ Edirne Municipality
 More works by Rıza @ ArtNet

1858 births
1913 deaths
19th-century painters from the Ottoman Empire
20th-century Turkish painters
Artists from Istanbul
Balkan Wars casualties